"Love Dimension" is a 1989 song by Australian singer Kate Ceberano. It was released in July 1989 on Festival Records as the second single from her third solo album, Brave. The single spent thirteen weeks in the top 50 of the Australian singles charts and peaked at No.14.

Track listing

12" single / Cass Single Track listing

CD single Track listing

Charts

Weekly Charts

Year-end charts

References

Kate Ceberano songs
1989 songs
Song recordings produced by Nick Launay
Festival Records singles
1989 singles